Eloise Quiñones Keber is Professor Emeritus of Art History at Baruch College and The Graduate Center, CUNY, where she specializes in Pre-Columbian and early colonial Latin American art. She earned her Ph.D from Columbia University in 1984.

Writings/Publications 
She published a scholarly edition of the important Aztec pictorial Codex Telleriano-Remensis, with commentary, which received the 1996 Ralph Waldo Emerson Award for humanistic studies from the Phi Beta Kappa Society. She is also co-author with H.B. Nicholson of Art of Aztec Mexico (National Gallery of Art, 1983).

She has edited Precious Greenstone, Precious Quetzal Feather (Labyrinthos, 2000), Chipping Away on Earth (Labyrinthos, 1994), and co-edited with H.B. Nicholson Mixteca Puebla (Labyrinthos, 1994) and The Work of Bernardino de Sahagún: Pioneer Ethnographer of 16th-Century Aztec Mexico (University of Texas Press, 1988) with J. Jorge Klor de Alva and H.B. Nicholson.

Honours 
She received the Baruch College Presidential Excellence Award in 1996, and was a recipient of fellowships and grants from the Guggenheim Foundation, the American Council of Learned Societies, National Endowment for the Humanities, Ford Foundation, Mellon Foundation, Getty Foundation, and the American Philosophical Society.

She received the 1996 Ralph Waldo Emerson Award in humanistic studies from the Phi Beta Kappa Society for Codex Telleriano Remensis and the 1996 Distinguished Scholarship Award from Baruch College, where she also teaches.

Research 
Prof. Quiñones-Keber’s research interests center primarily on Mesoamerican manuscripts, Aztec art before and after the Spanish conquest, and issues surrounding the encounter between indigenous and European traditions in the Americas. She is currently working on a book on “reinventing Aztec art”, for which she was awarded a Guggenheim Fellowship in 1998-1999.

References

External links
http://web.gc.cuny.edu/lastudies/eloisequinoneskeber.htm
http://web.gc.cuny.edu/dept/arthi/faculty/keber.html
http://societyoffellows.columbia.edu/fellows/eloise-quinones-keber/

Columbia University alumni
Baruch College faculty
American art historians
Women art historians
American Mesoamericanists
Women Mesoamericanists
Historians of Mesoamerican art
Aztec scholars
Year of birth missing (living people)
Living people
20th-century Mesoamericanists
21st-century Mesoamericanists
American women historians
20th-century American women writers
21st-century American women writers
20th-century American non-fiction writers
21st-century American non-fiction writers